The Madrid runway disaster was on 7December 1983 when a departing Iberia Boeing 727 struck an Aviaco McDonnell Douglas DC-9 at Madrid-Barajas Airport, causing the deaths of 93 passengers and crew.

Crash
On 7 December 1983, a Boeing 727 of Iberia (Spain's state airline) registered EC-CFJ, operating Iberia Flight 350, a scheduled flight to Rome's Leonardo da Vinci–Fiumicino Airport, was cleared for take-off from Madrid-Barajas Airport's Runway 01 in conditions of thick fog. At the same time, a DC-9 of Aviaco registered EC-CGS, operating  Aviaco Flight 134, was taxiing to the end of the same runway for take-off bound for Santander Airport. As the Boeing 727 rolled along the runway, the crew of the DC-9 accidentally made a wrong turn in the fog and taxied their aircraft onto the runway, into the path of the 727. The crew of the 727 saw the DC-9 and attempted to avoid the collision by rotating their aircraft for lift-off, however the 727 had not reached flying speed and its rear fuselage struck the DC-9. Among those killed were Mexican actress Fanny Cano (she was aboard the Iberia 727) and South African pianist Marc Raubenheimer.

Investigation
Investigators found that the Boeing 727 and DC-9 had collided due to the poor visibility at the airport, as well as inadequate signs and markings, which led to the  entering the runway without clearance as the Boeing 727 was taking off.

See also

 1990 Wayne County Airport runway collision, another fatal runway incursion involving a Boeing 727 and a DC-9.
 1983 Anchorage runway collision, another December 1983 runway collision involving incorrect taxiing in dense fog.
 Linate Airport disaster, a runway collision in Italy killing 118 people and also involving incorrect taxiing in dense fog.
 Tenerife airport disaster, another collision of two 747 aircraft at a Spanish airport in fog and the worst aircraft accident in history in terms of loss-of-life, with 583 lives lost.

References

External links
Final report (Archive)
Final report (Archive) 



1983 in Spain
Aviation accidents and incidents in 1983
Runway incursions
Airliner accidents and incidents caused by pilot error
Airliner accidents and incidents involving fog
Aviation accidents and incidents in Spain
Accidents and incidents involving the Boeing 727
Accidents and incidents involving the McDonnell Douglas DC-9
Iberia (airline) accidents and incidents
Aviaco accidents and incidents
Adolfo Suárez Madrid–Barajas Airport
Airliner accidents and incidents involving ground collisions
December 1983 events in Europe